Val is a village in the Thane district of Maharashtra, India. It is located in the Bhiwandi taluka.

Demographics 

According to the 2011 census of India, Val has 332 households. The effective literacy rate (i.e. the literacy rate of population excluding children aged 6 and below) is 91.51%.

References 

Villages in Bhiwandi taluka